Anditomin is an oxygenated meroterpenoid produced by Aspergillus stellatus or Aspergillus variecolor.

Aspergillus variecolor produces anditomin from 3,5-dimethylorsellinic acid and farnesyl pyrophosphate using 12 enzymes. The enzyme AndA firstly dehydrogenates one ring of preandiloid B to make preaniloid C. Next it causes a complex ring isomerisation to make anditomin.

Properties
Anditomin  can dissolve in ethyl acetate or chloroform.
Anditomin forms tetragonal crystals with space group P41 (No. 76), with unit cell dimensions a = 9.310 and c = 24.84 Å, and unit cell volume = 2153 Å3 with Z = 4, and density = 1.27 gcm−3.

References

Heterocyclic compounds with 6 rings
Cyclic ketones
Gamma-lactones
Epsilon-lactones
Meroterpenes